The Bruiser is a 1916 American silent drama film directed by Charles Bartlett. The film stars Charlotte Burton and William Russell.

Cast
 William Russell as "Big Bill" Brawley
 Charlotte Burton as Fen Bernham
 George Ferguson as Modest Tim
 Lizette Thorne as Norma Kenwick
 Roy Stewart as Manson Kenwick
 Pete Morrison as Charley, Fen's brother
 Al Fordyce as Munsey
 Eric Jacobs as Butler

External links

1916 films
1916 drama films
Silent American drama films
American silent feature films
American black-and-white films
Films directed by Charles Bartlett
1910s American films